Christian Hoffmann (born 22 December 1974 in Aigen im Mühlkreis) is an Austrian former cross-country skier who began competing in 1994. He won the bronze medal in the 50 km at the 1998 Winter Olympics in Nagano. Four years later at the 2002 Winter Olympics in Salt Lake City, Hoffmann finished second in the 30 km freestyle mass start event to Spain's Johann Mühlegg, but was awarded the gold medal in 2004 upon Mühlegg's blood-doping disqualification of darbepoetin.

Hoffmann's best individual finish at the FIS Nordic World Ski Championships was fifth in the 50 km in 2001. He also won gold in the 4 x 10 km relay at the 1999 FIS Nordic World Ski Championships in Ramsau.

Hoffman also won two World Cup events in his career (10 km: 2003, 30 km: 2004). He and fellow skier Mikhail Botvinov also encountered controversy regarding blood doping in 2002, though both were cleared by the IOC on April 9, 2002. In July 2012 the Austrian Anti-Doping Agency (NADA) gave Hoffman a two-year ban for violation of anti-doping-guidelines.

Cross-country skiing results
All results are sourced from the International Ski Federation (FIS).

Olympic Games
 2 medals – (1 gold, 1 bronze)

World Championships
 1 medal – (1 gold)

World Cup

Season standings

Individual podiums
2 victories – (2 )
20 podiums – (19 , 1 )

Team podiums
 3 victories – (3 ) 
 7 podiums – (7 )

Note:  Until the 1999 World Championships, World Championship races were included in the World Cup scoring system.

References

External links 
 
 
  
skifaster.net April 9, 2002 article clearing Botvinov and Hoffman.

1974 births
Living people
Sportspeople from Upper Austria
Austrian male cross-country skiers
Cross-country skiers at the 1998 Winter Olympics
Cross-country skiers at the 2002 Winter Olympics
Doping cases in cross-country skiing
Olympic gold medalists for Austria
Olympic medalists in cross-country skiing
FIS Nordic World Ski Championships medalists in cross-country skiing
Austrian sportspeople in doping cases
Medalists at the 2002 Winter Olympics
Medalists at the 1998 Winter Olympics
Olympic bronze medalists for Austria
People from Rohrbach District
20th-century Austrian people
21st-century Austrian people